Pekkarinen is a Finnish surname. Notable people with the surname include:

 Pentti Pekkarinen (1917–1975), Finnish farmer and politician
 Mauri Pekkarinen (born 1947), Finnish politician
 Sannamaija Pekkarinen (born 1980), Finnish actress
 Veli-Pekka Pekkarinen (born 1969), Finnish ice hockey player

Finnish-language surnames